1994 was the third season Russia held its own national football competition since the breakup of the Soviet Union.

Club competitions

FC Spartak Moscow won the league for the third time in a row.

Lower leagues were re-organized, with second-highest First League converted to one zone and a new professional Third League started.

For more details, see:
1994 Russian Top League
1994 Russian First League
1994 Russian Second League
1994 Russian Third League

Cup competitions
The second edition of the Russian Cup, 1993–94 Russian Cup was won by FC Spartak Moscow, who beat PFC CSKA Moscow in the finals in a shootout 4-2 after finishing extra time at 2-2.

Early stages of the 1994–95 Russian Cup were played later in the year.

European club competitions

1993–94 UEFA Champions League

FC Spartak Moscow finished the group stage in third place, not qualifying for the semifinals.

 March 2, 1994 / Group A, Day 3 / FC Spartak Moscow - FC Barcelona 2-2 (Rodionov  Karpin  - Stoichkov  Romário ) / Moscow, Luzhniki Stadium / Attendance: 60,000
FC Spartak Moscow: Staučė, Khlestov, Ivanov, Tsymbalar, Pisarev (Rodionov, 46), Nikiforov, Ternavski, Karpin (captain), Piatnitski, Lediakhov, Beschastnykh.
 March 15, 1994 / Group A, Day 4 / FC Barcelona - FC Spartak Moscow 5-1 (Stoichkov  Amor  Koeman   Romário  - Karpin ) / Barcelona, Camp Nou / Attendance: 100,000
FC Spartak Moscow: Staučė, Khlestov, Ivanov, Tsymbalar, Ternavski, Nikiforov, Onopko (captain), Karpin, Piatnitski, Lediakhov (Rodionov, 46), Beschastnykh (Pisarev, 73).
 March 30, 1994 / Group A, Day 5 / FC Spartak Moscow - AS Monaco FC 0-0 / Moscow, Luzhniki Stadium / Attendance: 30,000
FC Spartak Moscow: Staučė, Mamedov, Ternavski (Khlestov, 75), Tsymbalar, Rodionov (Pisarev, 61), Nikiforov, Onopko (captain), Karpin, Piatnitski, Lediakhov, Beschastnykh.
 April 13, 1994 / Group A, Day 6 / Galatasaray - FC Spartak Moscow 1-2 (Cihat  - Onopko  Karpin ) / Istanbul, Ali Sami Yen Stadium / Attendance: 17,000
FC Spartak Moscow: Staučė, Mamedov, Ternavski, Tsymbalar (Lediakhov, 77), Pisarev, Nikiforov, Onopko (captain), Karpin, Piatnitski, Masalitin (Alenichev, 80), Beschastnykh.

1993–94 UEFA Cup Winners' Cup and 1993–94 UEFA Cup
All the Russian participants were eliminated in 1993.

1994–95 UEFA Champions League

FC Spartak Moscow qualified directly for the group stage. It did not qualify from the group, coming in third place.

 September 14, 1994 / Group B, Day 1 / FC Dynamo Kyiv - FC Spartak Moscow 3-2 (Leonenko   Rebrov  - Pisarev  Tikhonov ) / Kyiv, Republican Stadium / Attendance: 90,500
Dynamo penalty kick by Mykhaylenko in the 24th minute was saved by Tyapushkin.
FC Spartak Moscow: Tyapushkin, Mamedov, Ternavski, Tsymbalar, Rakhimov, Chudin, Naduda, Alenichev (Mukhamadiev, 61), Piatnitski (captain), Pisarev, Tikhonov (Rodionov, 43).
 September 28, 1994 / Group B, Day 2 / FC Spartak Moscow - Paris Saint-Germain F.C. 1-2 (Rakhimov  Mamedov  - Le Guen  Valdo ) / Moscow, Luzhniki Stadium / Attendance: 47,000
FC Spartak Moscow: Tyapushkin, Mamedov, Tikhonov, Tsymbalar, Rakhimov, Nikiforov, Onopko (captain), Khlestov, Piatnitski, Pisarev, Mukhamadiev (Alenichev, 68).
 October 19, 1994 / Group B, Day 3 / FC Spartak Moscow - FC Bayern Munich 1-1 (Pisarev  - Babbel ) / Moscow, Luzhniki Stadium / Attendance: 25,000
FC Spartak Moscow: Tyapushkin, Ananko, Kechinov, Tsymbalar, Rakhimov, Nikiforov (Ternavski, 85), Onopko (captain), Tikhonov, Piatnitski, Pisarev, Mukhamadiev (Konovalov, 75).
 November 2, 1994 / Group B, Day 4 / FC Bayern Munich - FC Spartak Moscow 2-2 (Nerlinger  Kuffour  - Tikhonov  Alenichev ) / Munich, Olympic Stadium / Attendance: 31,000
FC Spartak Moscow: Tyapushkin, Ananko, Khlestov, Alenichev, Rakhimov, Nikiforov, Onopko (captain), Tikhonov, Piatnitski, Pisarev (Naduda, 85), Kechinov.
 November 23, 1994 / Group B, Day 5 / FC Spartak Moscow - FC Dynamo Kyiv 1-0 (Mukhamadiev ) / Moscow, Luzhniki Stadium / Attendance: 35,000
FC Spartak Moscow: Tyapushkin, Khlestov, Lipko, Alenichev, Rakhimov, Nikiforov, Onopko (captain), Tikhonov, Piatnitski (Naduda, 88), Pisarev (Konovalov, 64), Mukhamadiev.
 December 7, 1994 / Group B, Day 6 / Paris Saint-Germain F.C. - FC Spartak Moscow 4-1 (Weah   Ginola  Raí  - Rodionov ) / Paris, Parc des Princes / Attendance: 31,461
Spartak penalty kick by Kechinov came off the post in the 57th minute.
FC Spartak Moscow: Tyapushkin, Khlestov, Lipko, Alenichev, Kechinov (Konovalov, 74), Nikiforov, Onopko (captain), Tikhonov, Piatnitski, Pisarev, Mukhamadiev (Rodionov, 46).

1994–95 UEFA Cup Winners' Cup
PFC CSKA Moscow were eliminated in the first round.

 September 15, 1994 / First Round, First Leg / PFC CSKA Moscow - Ferencvárosi TC 2-1 (Mamchur  Sergeyev  - Kenneth Christiansen ) / Moscow, Dynamo Stadium / Attendance: 9,000
PFC CSKA Moscow: Novosadov, Radimov, Kolotovkin, Mashkarin, Mamchur, Shoukov (Semak, 62), Antonovich, Broshin, Sinyov, Tatarchuk (Sergeyev, 46), Faizulin.
 September 29, 1994 / First Round, Return Leg / Ferencvárosi TC - PFC CSKA Moscow 2-1 (Lipcsei  Neagoe  - Radimov  Faizulin ); 7-6 in shootout (Gregor  Lisztes  Kenneth Christiansen  Telek  Lipcsei  Zavadszky  Hrutka  - Bystrov  Bushmanov  Demchenko  Mamchur  Minko  Broshin  Kolotovkin ) / Budapest, Üllői úti stadion / Attendance: 18,000
PFC CSKA Moscow: Novosadov, Radimov, Kolotovkin, Bystrov, Mamchur, Mashkarin (Bushmanov, 46), Sinyov (Demchenko, 71), Broshin, Minko, Shoukov, Faizulin.

1994–95 UEFA Cup
FC Rotor Volgograd and FC Tekstilshchik Kamyshin were both eliminated by FC Nantes in the first and second round respectively, with Nicolas Ouédec scoring 7 goals in 4 games. FC Dynamo Moscow were eliminated in the second round.

 September 13, 1994 / first round, first leg / R.F.C. Seraing – FC Dynamo Moscow 3–4 (Wamberto  Schaessens  Edmilson  – Smirnov  Cheryshev   Simutenkov ) / Seraing, Pairay Stadium / attendance: 7,172
FC Dynamo Moscow: Smetanin, Timofeev, Samatov, Shulgin, Smirnov, Chernyshov (captain), Klyuyev, Cheryshev, Tetradze (Borodkin, 69), Ivanov, Simutenkov.
 September 13, 1994 / first round, first leg / FC Rotor Volgograd – FC Nantes 3–2 (Gerashchenko  Nechay  Veretennikov  – Ouédec  N'Doram ) / Volgograd, Central Stadium / attendance: 38,000
FC Rotor Volgograd: Samorukov, Zhunenko, Burlachenko, Gerashchenko (captain), Nechay, Tsarenko, Yeshchenko (Shmarko, 69), Niederhaus (Berketov, 87), Veretennikov, Yesipov, Nechayev.
 September 13, 1994 / first round, first leg / FC Tekstilshchik Kamyshin – Békéscsaba 6–1 (Gusakov  Polstyanov   Volgin  Filippov   – Szarvas ) / Moscow, Dynamo Stadium / attendance: 2,000
FC Tekstilshchik Kamyshin: Filimonov, A. Morozov, Minayev (captain), Yudin, Zhabko, O. Morozov, Navochenko, Tsygankov (Rozin, 72), Filippov, Volgin, Gusakov (Polstyanov, 51).
 September 27, 1994 / first round, return leg / FC Dynamo Moscow – R.F.C. Seraing 0–1 (Schaessens ) / Moscow, Dynamo Stadium / attendance: 5,000
FC Dynamo Moscow: Smetanin, Timofeev, Samatov, S. Nekrasov, Smirnov (Kutsenko, 41), Chernyshov (captain), Klyuyev, Cheryshev, Yakhimovich, Ivanov, Simutenkov.
 September 27, 1994 / first round, return leg / FC Nantes – FC Rotor Volgograd 3–0 (Ouédec   Loko ) / Nantes, La Beaujoire / attendance: 36,000
Nantes penalty kick by Ouédec in the 72nd minute missed the goal.
FC Rotor Volgograd: Samorukov, Zhunenko, Burlachenko, Gerashchenko (captain), Nechay, Tsarenko, Yeshchenko (Khuzin, 60), Niederhaus, Veretennikov (Troynin, 75), Yesipov, Nechayev.
 September 27, 1994 / first round, return leg / Békéscsaba – FC Tekstilshchik Kamyshin 1–0 (Csató ) / attendance: 2,000
FC Tekstilshchik Kamyshin: Filimonov, A. Morozov, Minayev (captain), Prokhorov, Tsygankov, O. Morozov, Navochenko, Rozin, Pimenov (Natalushko, 46), Volgin, Filippov (Kuznetsov, 72).
 October 18, 1994 / second round, first leg / FC Dynamo Moscow – Real Madrid 2–2 (Simutenkov  Cheryshev  – Sandro  Zamorano ) / Moscow, Dynamo Stadium / attendance: 7,000
FC Dynamo Moscow: Smetanin, Timofeev, Kovtun, S. Nekrasov, Samatov, Chernyshov (captain), Klyuyev, Cheryshev, Yakhimovich, Ivanov, Simutenkov.
 October 19, 1994 / second round, first leg / FC Nantes – FC Tekstilshchik Kamyshin 2–0 (Ouédec  ) / Nantes, La Beaujoire / attendance: 34,000
FC Tekstilshchik Kamyshin: Filimonov, A. Morozov, Minayev (captain), Yudin, Zhabko, O. Morozov (Rozin, 87), Navochenko, Tsygankov, Filippov, Volgin, Natalushko (Pimenov, 84).
 November 1, 1994 / second round, return leg / Real Madrid – FC Dynamo Moscow 4–0 (Zamorano  Redondo  Dani  ) / Madrid, Santiago Bernabéu Stadium / attendance: 60,000
FC Dynamo Moscow: Smetanin, Samatov, Kovtun, Khidiyatullin (Borodkin, 61), Shulgin, S. Nekrasov, Filippov (Klyuyev, 12), Cheryshev, Yakhimovich, Ivanov, Simutenkov.
 November 1, 1994 / second round, return leg / FC Tekstilshchik Kamyshin – FC Nantes 1–2 (Polstyanov  – Ouédec  ) / Moscow, Dynamo Stadium / attendance: 7,000
FC Tekstilshchik Kamyshin: Filimonov, A. Morozov (Polstyanov, 64), Minayev (captain), Yudin, Zhabko, O. Morozov, Navochenko, Rozin, Filippov, Pimenov, Natalushko.

National team
Russia national football team played at the 1994 FIFA World Cup, not qualifying from the group, even though Oleg Salenko became the top scorer of the competition. In late 1993, 14 players signed a letter demanding the resignation of Pavel Sadyrin and appointment of Anatoliy Byshovets as the manager. Sadyrin stayed as the manager. Some of the players who signed returned to the team, but several (Igor Dobrovolski, Igor Shalimov, Igor Kolyvanov, Sergei Kiriakov, Vasili Kulkov, Andrei Kanchelskis and Andrei Ivanov) did not play at the World Cup. After the tournament, Sadyrin was replaced by Oleg Romantsev for the subsequent games.

 January 29, 1994 / Friendly / United States - Russia 1-1 (Lalas  - Radchenko ) / Seattle, Kingdome / Attendance: 43,700
Russia: Khapov, Gorlukovich, Galiamin, Popov, D. Kuznetsov (Cheryshev, 74), Tetradze, Tatarchuk (Tedeyev, 57), Korneev (Rakhimov, 83), Salenko, Borodyuk (captain), Radchenko.

 February 2, 1994 / Friendly / Mexico - Russia 1-4 (García Aspe  - Borodyuk    Radchenko ) / Oakland, The Oakland Coliseum / Attendance: 18,162
Russia: Khapov, Gorlukovich, Galiamin, Popov (Podpaly, 79), D. Kuznetsov, Tetradze, Korneev, Tedeyev (Cheryshev, 70), Salenko, Borodyuk (captain), Radchenko (Tatarchuk, 85).

 March 23, 1994 / Friendly / Ireland - Russia 0-0 / Dublin, Lansdowne Road / Attendance: 36,000
Russia: Kharine, Gorlukovich, Rakhimov, Kovtun, Tetradze, Korneev (Cheryshev, 58), Popov, D. Kuznetsov, Salenko, Borodyuk (captain), Radchenko (Kosolapov, 87).

 April 20, 1994 / Friendly / Turkey - Russia 0-1 (Radchenko ) / Bursa, Bursa Atatürk Stadium / Attendance: 28,000
Russia: Kharine, Galiamin, Nikiforov (Tatarchuk, 81), Tsymbalar, Gorlukovich, Ternavski, D. Kuznetsov, Popov, Borodyuk (captain) (Beschastnykh, 60), Yuran (Onopko, 46), Radchenko (Lediakhov, 87).

 May 29, 1994 / Friendly / Russia - Slovakia 2-1 (Piatnitski  Tsymbalar  - Tittel ) / Moscow, Luzhniki Stadium / Attendance: 8,000
Russia: Kharine (captain), Galiamin, Onopko, Nikiforov, D. Kuznetsov, Ternavski, Piatnitski, Tsymbalar, Salenko, Mostovoi, Radchenko.

 June 20, 1994 / 1994 FIFA World Cup, Group B / Brazil - Russia 2-0 (Romário  Raí ) / Stanford Stadium, Stanford / Attendance: 81,061
Russia: Kharine (captain), Nikiforov, Gorlukovich, Khlestov, D. Kuznetsov, Ternavski, Piatnitski, Karpin, Tsymbalar, Yuran (Salenko, 56), Radchenko (Borodyuk, 76).

 June 24, 1994 / 1994 FIFA World Cup, Group B / Sweden - Russia 3-1 (Brolin  Dahlin   - Salenko  Gorlukovich ) / Pontiac, Pontiac Silverdome / Attendance: 71,528
Russia: Kharine (captain), Gorlukovich, Nikiforov, D. Kuznetsov, Khlestov, Popov (Karpin, 40), Onopko, Mostovoi, Borodyuk (Galiamin, 50), Salenko, Radchenko.

 June 28, 1994 / 1994 FIFA World Cup, Group B / Cameroon - Russia 1-6 (Milla  - Salenko      Radchenko ) / Stanford Stadium, Stanford / Attendance: 74,914
Russia: Cherchesov, Khlestov, Nikiforov, Ternavski, Onopko (captain), Tsymbalar, Tetradze, Korneev (Radchenko, 65), Karpin, Lediakhov (Beschastnykh, 77), Salenko.

 August 17, 1994 / Friendly / Austria - Russia 0-3 (Beschastnykh  Nikiforov  Simutenkov ) / Klagenfurt, Wörtherseestadion / Attendance: 11,000
Russia: Cherchesov (Kharine, 46), Mamedov, Ternavski (Kulkov, 59), Tsymbalar, Rakhimov (Radimov, 46), Nikiforov, Onopko (captain), Yesipov (Mandreko, 46), Beschastnykh, Tetradze (Kosolapov, 83), Simutenkov (Niederhaus, 83).

 September 7, 1994 / Friendly / Russia - Germany 0-1 (Kuntz ) / Moscow, Luzhniki Stadium / Attendance: 40,000
Russia: Cherchesov, Mamedov, Kulkov, Tsymbalar, Shalimov (Tetradze, 46), Nikiforov, Onopko (captain), Kanchelskis (Karpin, 46), Piatnitski, Kolyvanov (Radchenko, 46), Kiriakov.

 October 12, 1994 / UEFA Euro 1996 qualifier / Russia - San Marino 4-0 (Karpin  Kolyvanov  Nikiforov  Radchenko ) / Moscow, Luzhniki Stadium / Attendance: 10,000
Russia: Cherchesov, Kulkov (Tetradze, 62), Nikiforov, Tsymbalar (Kolyvanov, 55), Shalimov, Karpin, Onopko (captain), Kanchelskis, Radchenko, Piatnitski, Kiriakov.

 November 16, 1994 / UEFA Euro 1996 qualifier / Scotland - Russia 1-1 (Booth  - Radchenko ) / Glasgow, Hampden Park / Attendance: 31,254
Russia: Cherchesov, Kulkov, Nikiforov, Gorlukovich, Shalimov, Karpin, Onopko (captain), Kanchelskis, Piatnitski (Tetradze, 75), Radchenko, Radimov.

References

 
Seasons in Russian football

it:Top League 1994